The 2022 Eastern Michigan Eagles football team represented Eastern Michigan University during the 2022 NCAA Division I FBS football season. The Eagles were led by ninth-year head coach Chris Creighton and played their home games at Rynearson Stadium in Ypsilanti, Michigan. They competed as members of the West Division of the Mid-American Conference (MAC). By finishing the regular season at 8–4, the Eagles reached eight wins for the first time since winning a school-record ten games in 1987.

Previous season 
The Eagles finished the 2021 season 7–6, 4–4 in MAC play to finish in a three-way tie for last place in the West Division. They received an invite to the LendingTree Bowl where they lost to Liberty.

Schedule

Game summaries

Eastern Kentucky

at Louisiana

at Arizona State

Buffalo

UMass

at Western Michigan

Northern Illinois

at Ball State

Toledo

Akron

at Kent State

Central Michigan

vs. San Jose State (Famous Idaho Potato Bowl)

References

Eastern Michigan
Eastern Michigan Eagles football seasons
Famous Idaho Potato Bowl champion seasons
Eastern Michigan Eagles football